Rei or REI' may refer to:

Arts and entertainment

Rei, a story arc of the anime Higurashi When They CryRei, a shapeshifting godlike dragon in the Australian webcomic series VaingloriousRei I, II and III, episodes of Neon Genesis Evangelion anime series

People
 given name
Rei (given name), a Japanese name, including a list of people and fictional characters with the name
Reihaneh Safavi-Naini, or Rei Safavi-Naini, Iranian-born computer science professor
Pelé (born 1940), ("The King" (O Rei)), Brazilian footballer
Eusébio (1942–2014), ("The King" (O Rei)), Portuguese footballer
José Fontana (footballer) ("Rei", 1912–1986), Brazilian footballer
Rei (wrestler), Hong Kong professional wrestler

surname
Aleksander Rei (1900–1943), Estonian politician
August Rei (1886–1963), Estonian politician
Leino Rei (born 1972), Estonian actor and theatre director

Other uses
Redlands Municipal Airport, California, U.S., FAA identifier REI
International Conference on Radiation Effects in Insulators (REI)
Recreational Equipment, Inc. (REI), an American retail and outdoor recreation services corporation
Remote error indication (REI), in synchronous optical networking 
Reproductive endocrinology and infertility (REI), a surgical subspecialty of obstetrics and gynecology

See also

Cristo Rei (disambiguation)
Reis (disambiguation)
Rey (disambiguation)Rei Rei'', a video animation series 

Estonian-language surnames